A carbonate is a salt of carbonic acid (H2CO3), characterized by the presence of the carbonate ion, a polyatomic ion with the formula . The word carbonate may also refer to a carbonate ester, an organic compound containing the carbonate group C(=O)(O–)2.

The term is also used as a verb, to describe carbonation: the process of raising the concentrations of carbonate and bicarbonate ions in water to produce carbonated water and other carbonated beverageseither by the addition of carbon dioxide gas under pressure or by dissolving carbonate or bicarbonate salts into the water.

In geology and mineralogy, the term "carbonate" can refer both to carbonate minerals and carbonate rock (which is made of chiefly carbonate minerals), and both are dominated by the carbonate ion, . Carbonate minerals are extremely varied and ubiquitous in chemically precipitated sedimentary rock. The most common are calcite or calcium carbonate, CaCO3, the chief constituent of limestone (as well as the main component of mollusc shells and coral skeletons); dolomite, a calcium-magnesium carbonate CaMg(CO3)2; and siderite, or iron(II) carbonate, FeCO3, an important iron ore. Sodium carbonate ("soda" or "natron") and potassium carbonate ("potash") have been used since antiquity for cleaning and preservation, as well as for the manufacture of glass. Carbonates are widely used in industry, such as in iron smelting, as a raw material for Portland cement and lime manufacture, in the composition of ceramic glazes, and more.

Structure and bonding

The carbonate ion is the simplest oxocarbon anion. It consists of one carbon atom surrounded by three oxygen atoms, in a trigonal planar arrangement, with D3h molecular symmetry. It has a molecular mass of 60.01 g/mol and carries a total formal charge of −2.

The Lewis structure of the carbonate ion has two (long) single bonds to negative oxygen atoms, and one short double bond to a neutral oxygen atom.

This structure is incompatible with the observed symmetry of the ion, which implies that the three bonds are the same length and that the three oxygen atoms are equivalent. As in the case of the isoelectronic nitrate ion, the symmetry can be achieved by a resonance among three structures:

This resonance can be summarized by a model with fractional bonds and delocalized charges:

Chemical properties
Metal carbonates generally decompose on heating, liberating carbon dioxide from the long term carbon cycle to the short term carbon cycle and leaving behind an oxide of the metal. This process is called calcination, after calx, the Latin name of quicklime or calcium oxide, CaO, which is obtained by roasting limestone in a lime kiln.

Exceptions include lithium, sodium, potassium, rubidium, caesium, and ammonium carbonates, as well as many uranium carbonates.

In aqueous solution, carbonate, bicarbonate, carbon dioxide, and carbonic acid exist together in a dynamic equilibrium. In strongly basic conditions, the carbonate ion predominates, while in weakly basic conditions, the bicarbonate ion is prevalent. In more acid conditions, aqueous carbon dioxide, CO2(aq), is the main form, which, with water, H2O, is in equilibrium with carbonic acidthe equilibrium lies strongly towards carbon dioxide. Thus sodium carbonate is basic, sodium bicarbonate is weakly basic, while carbon dioxide itself is a weak acid.

Carbonated water is formed by dissolving CO2 in water under pressure. When the partial pressure of CO2 is reduced, for example when a can of soda is opened, the equilibrium for each of the forms of carbonate (carbonate, bicarbonate, carbon dioxide, and carbonic acid) shifts until the concentration of CO2 in the solution is equal to the solubility of CO2 at that temperature and pressure. In living systems an enzyme, carbonic anhydrase, speeds the interconversion of CO2 and carbonic acid.

Although the carbonate salts of most metals are insoluble in water, the same is not true of the bicarbonate salts. In solution this equilibrium between carbonate, bicarbonate, carbon dioxide and carbonic acid changes constantly to the changing temperature and pressure conditions. In the case of metal ions with insoluble carbonates, such as CaCO3, formation of insoluble compounds results. This is an explanation for the buildup of scale inside pipes caused by hard water.

Carbonate in the inorganic nomenclature
Systematic additive IUPAC name for carbonate anion is trioxidocarbonate(2−). Similarly, cyanide anion CN− is named nitridocarbonate(1−). However, following the same logic for carbonate(4−) (orthocarbonic acid), by similitude to silicate(4−) (orthosilicic acid), in the systematic additive nomenclature makes no sense as this species has never been identified under normal conditions of temperature and pressure. Orthocarbonic acid is energetically much less stable than orthosilicic acid and cannot exist under normal conditions because of the energetically unfavorable orbital configuration of a single central carbon atom bound to four oxygen atoms.

Organic carbonates

In organic chemistry a carbonate can also refer to a functional group within a larger molecule that contains a carbon atom bound to three oxygen atoms, one of which is double bonded. These compounds are also known as organocarbonates or carbonate esters, and have the general formula ROCOOR′, or RR′CO3. Important organocarbonates include dimethyl carbonate, the cyclic compounds ethylene carbonate and propylene carbonate, and the phosgene replacement, triphosgene.

Buffer
Three reversible reactions control the pH balance of blood and act as a buffer to stabilise it in the range 7.37–7.43: 

 
 
 

Exhaled CO2(g) depletes CO2(aq), which in turn consumes H2CO3, causing the equilibrium of the first reaction to try to restore the level of carbonic acid by reacting bicarbonate with a hydrogen ion, an example of Le Châtelier's principle. The result is to make the blood more alkaline (raise pH). By the same principle, when the pH is too high, the kidneys excrete bicarbonate into urine as urea via the urea cycle (or Krebs–Henseleit ornithine cycle). By removing the bicarbonate, more H+ is generated from carbonic acid (H2CO3), which comes from CO2(g) produced by cellular respiration.

Crucially, a similar buffer operates in the oceans. It is a major factor in climate change and the long-term carbon cycle, due to the large number of marine organisms (especially coral) which are made of calcium carbonate. Increased solubility of carbonate through increased temperatures results in lower production of marine calcite and increased concentration of atmospheric carbon dioxide. This, in turn, increases Earth temperature. The amount of  available is on a geological scale and substantial quantities may eventually be redissolved into the sea and released to the atmosphere, increasing CO2 levels even more.

Carbonate salts

 Carbonate overview:

Presence outside Earth
It is generally thought that the presence of carbonates in rock is strong evidence for the presence of liquid water. Recent observations of the planetary nebula NGC 6302 show evidence for carbonates in space, where aqueous alteration similar to that on Earth is unlikely. Other minerals have been proposed which would fit the observations.

Until recently carbonate deposits have not been found on Mars via remote sensing or in situ missions, even though Martian meteorites contain small amounts. Groundwater may have existed at Gusev and Meridiani Planum.

See also
 Cap carbonates
 Oxalate
 Peroxocarbonate
 Sodium percarbonate

References

External links

Carbonate/bicarbonate/carbonic acid equilibrium in water: pH of solutions, buffer capacity, titration and species distribution vs. pH computed with a free spreadsheet

 
Oxyanions